Highway 720 is a highway in the Canadian province of Saskatchewan. It runs from Highway 363 near Neidpath to Highway 19 near Flowing Well.

See also 
Roads in Saskatchewan
Transportation in Saskatchewan

References 

720